The 2018 Stockholm Open (also known as the Intrum Stockholm Open for sponsorship purposes) was a professional men's tennis tournament played on indoor hard courts. It was the 50th edition of the tournament, and part of the ATP World Tour 250 series of the 2018 ATP World Tour. It took place at the Kungliga tennishallen in Stockholm, Sweden from 15 to 21 October 2018. Third-seeded Stefanos Tsitsipas won the singles title.

Singles main-draw entrants

Seeds

 1 Rankings are as of October 8, 2018

Other entrants
The following players received wildcards into the singles main draw:
  Chung Hyeon
  Elias Ymer
  Mikael Ymer

The following players received entry from the qualifying draw:
  Ernests Gulbis
  Oscar Otte
  Peter Polansky
  Alexei Popyrin

The following player received entry as a lucky loser:
  Jürgen Zopp

Withdrawals
Before the tournament
  Peter Gojowczyk → replaced by  Jürgen Zopp

Retirements
  Chung Hyeon

Doubles main-draw entrants

Seeds

 Rankings are as of October 8, 2018

Other entrants
The following pairs received wildcards into the doubles main draw:
  Markus Eriksson /  André Göransson 
  Elias Ymer /  Mikael Ymer

Finals

Singles

  Stefanos Tsitsipas defeated  Ernests Gulbis, 6–4, 6–4

Doubles

  Luke Bambridge /  Jonny O'Mara defeated  Marcus Daniell /  Wesley Koolhof, 7–5, 7–6(10–8)

References

External links
 Official website 

 
Stockholm Open
Stockholm Open
2018 in Swedish tennis
Stockholm Open
2010s in Stockholm